Evgeni Karamanov (born 26 March 1986) is a Bulgarian footballer currently playing as a goalkeeper for Zagorets Nova Zagora.

Karamanov comes directly from Sliven`s Youth Academy. He made his debut for the first squad on 29 April 2007 in a match of the B PFG against Chernomorets Burgas. In the next 2007-08 season Karamanov played 18 matches and helped the team gain promotion to the first division.

Club statistics
As of 22 January 2013

Awards
 Champion of B PFG 2013 (with Neftochimic Burgas)

References

External links

1986 births
Living people
Bulgarian footballers
OFC Sliven 2000 players
Neftochimic Burgas players
First Professional Football League (Bulgaria) players

Association football goalkeepers
Sportspeople from Sliven